The , also known as , is a Sendagaya, Shibuya-based talent management agency and cooperative representing Japanese voice actors.

Current members

The members of Haikyō, as of this date, are:
Male

Wataru Abe
Chō (Yūichi Nagashima)
Issei Futamata
Yūichi Iguchi
Masaru Ikeda
Shūichi Ikeda
Kazuhiko Kishino
Dai Matsumoto
Akira Murayama
Tadashi Nakamura
Masatomo Nakazawa
Masanori Shinohara
Junichi Suwabe
Gakuto Kajiwara
Yasuaki Takumi
Kōichi Tōchika
Kentarō Kumagai

Female

Miho Arakawa 
Masako Ikeda
Sawa Ishige
Shizuka Ishikawa
Reiko Katsura
Juri Kimura
Hisako Kyōda
Junko Minagawa
Saki Miyashita
Chiaki Morita
Kaoru Morota
Kazusa Murai
Tomo Muranaka
Akiko Nakagawa
Saki Nakajima
Yūko Nakamura
Rio Natsuki
Sayaka Ohara
Sumie Sakai
Nozomi Sasaki
Yōko Sasaki
Rina Satō
Toshiko Sawada
Ai Shimizu
Yū Sugimoto
Eri Suzuki
Hiroko Taguchi
Minami Takahashi
Nao Tamura
Atsumi Tanezaki
Masumi Tazawa
Azumi Waki
Hibiku Yamamura

Former members

Former members of Haikyō, as of this date, are:
Male

Shin Aomori (moved to Sigma Seven)
Tōru Furuya (moved to Aoni Production)
Goblin (moved to Across Entertainment)
Kōichi Hashimoto (moved to Production Tanc)
Michio Hazama (represents Mouvement)
Shōzō Iizuka (moved to Sigma Seven)
Seizō Katō (deceased)
Kōichi Kitamura (Hajimu Kimura) (moved to Mausu Promotion before death)
Motomu Kiyokawa (deceased)
Kiyoshi Kobayashi (deceased)
Yasuaki Kurata (represents Kurata Promotion)
Hiroshi Masuoka (deceased)
Tatsuo Matsumura (deceased)
Bandō Mitsugorō X (Bandō Yasosuke V)
Katsuji Mori (represents Office Mori)
Ichirō Nagai (moved to Aoni Production before death)
Shūsei Nakamura (retired)
Ryūsei Nakao (moved to 81 Produce)
Daisuke Namikawa (moved to Across Entertainment)
Toku Nishio (deceased)
Nachi Nozawa (moved to Ken Production before death)
Tamio Ōki (moved to Mausu Promotion before death)
Teiji Ōmiya (deceased)
Ryūzaburō Ōtomo (moved to Aoni Production)
Ikuya Sawaki (moved to Arts Vision)
Tomokazu Seki (moved to Atomic Monkey)
Hidekatsu Shibata (moved to Aoni Production)
Akira Shimada (moved to Engekishūdan Mitō before death)
Daisaku Shinohara (moved to 81 Produce)
Hirotaka Suzuoki (moved to Ken Production before death)
Kazuya Tatekabe (became manager of Kenyū Office before death)
Naoki Tatsuta (moved to Aoni Production)
Kenjirō Tsuda (moved to Mediarte Entertainment Works as a voice actor and to Stardust Promotion as an actor)
Toshiya Ueda (moved to 81 Produce)
Takeshi Watabe (moved to 81 Produce before death)
Kōichi Yamadera (moved to Across Entertainment)
Naoki Yanagi (manages deux and represents FreeMarch)
Jōji Yanami (moved to Aoni Production before retirement and death)
Kazuki Yao (moved to Sigma Seven)
Daisuke Kishio (moved to Horipro)

Female

Miyoko Asō (deceased)
Fumi Hirano (moved to Horipro)
Chieko Honda (moved to Max Mix before death)
Kazue Ikura (moved to Aoni Production)
Yō Inoue (deceased)
Midori Katō (went freelance)
Ryōko Kinomiya (Deceased)
Rica Matsumoto (moved to Sun Music)
Yōko Matsuoka (moved to 81 Produce)
Rie Murakawa (moved to Stay Luck)
Miki Nagasawa (moved to Atomic Monkey)
Michiko Nomura (general manager of Ken Production)
Fumiko Orikasa (moved to Atomic Monkey)
Yoshino Ōtori (moved to Ken Production)
Yoshiko Sakakibara (went freelance)
Chika Sakamoto (Chinatsu Ishihara) (moved to Arts Vision)
Eri Sendai (moved to Amuleto)
Masako Sugaya (moved to Arts Vision)
Hiroko Suzuki (moved to Ken Production)
Sanae Takagi (moved to Aoni Production)
Gara Takashima (moved to Across Entertainment)
Sakiko Tamagawa (moved to Sigma Seven)
Michie Tomizawa (moved to Aoni Production)
Keiko Yokozawa (Keiko Nanba) (represents Yūrin Pro)
Konami Yoshida (moved to Production Tanc)

External links
Homepage in Japanese

Talent agencies based in Tokyo
Japanese voice actor management companies
Mass media companies based in Tokyo
Cooperatives in Japan